Philadelphia Brewing Company is a brewery founded in July 2007 in the Kensington neighborhood of Philadelphia, USA.

History 
Philadelphia Brewing was founded in July 2007 by William Barton, Nancy Barton and James McBride. It is located in the original 1885 building of the Weisbrod & Hess Oriental Brewing Company, which operated on the site until 1939.

The Bartons are former co-owners of Yards Brewing Company. As partners in that company, and on its behalf, they acquired and renovated the brewery facility in 2001. After a dispute with Yards co-founder Tom Kehoe over the future direction of the company, the pair resigned from Yards in 2007. In early 2007, the Bartons struck an agreement with Kehoe to surrender their interest in Yards in exchange for control of its facility. The Bartons were able to retain their entire staff of Yards employees along with the brewing equipment.  (Kehoe had Yards products contract brewed at the Lion Brewery in Wilkes-Barre, PA and would later move to a new facility near the Delaware River.) The Bartons and McBride formally launched Philadelphia Brewing Company beers on March 5, 2008.

Two of the company's most popular beers, Kenzinger and Walt Wit, are available on tap at Citizens Bank Park, the South Philadelphia baseball park where the Philadelphia Phillies play.

Operations 
The company brews five year-round beers, several seasonal beers and the occasional one-off recipe. It sources ingredients locally, does not use preservatives and operates as its own distributor.

Approximately 85 percent of Philadelphia Brewing Co.'s sales are in the Philadelphia region with an additional 10 percent in the Pittsburgh area. The company's Pittsburgh offices are the former home of Duquesne Brewing Company.

Products 

Year-round beers
 Kenzinger (German Pilsner)
 Newbold IPA (American IPA)
 Pennsylvania Pale Ale (American Pale Ale)
 PHL session IPA (American IPA)
 Walt Wit (Witbier)

Seasonal beers
 Fleur de Lehigh (Belgian Pale Ale)
 Joe Coffee Porter (American Porter)
 Kenz O'Lantern (Pumpkin Ale)
 Harvest from the Hood (Fall Seasonal Ale)
 Winter Wünder (Winter Seasonal Ale)
 Shackamaximum (Imperial Stout)
 Kilty Pleasure (Scotch Ale)

Inactive beers
 Broadcaster Brown Ale (American Brown Ale)
 Engine 1892 Market Stout (American Stout)
 Bitter Canadian IPeh? (American IPA)
 BiBerry Ale (Seasonal Fruit Beer)
 Philly'z Navidad (Lager)
 Row House Red  (Amber Ale)

See also

 List of breweries in Philadelphia
 List of breweries in Pennsylvania
 Beer in the United States

References

External links 
 Official website

Beer brewing companies based in Pennsylvania
Manufacturing companies based in Philadelphia
Food and drink companies based in Philadelphia